Sarah Mansbridge is a former Welsh international lawn bowler.

Bowls career
Mansbridge won the triples gold medal with Betty Morgan and Kathy Pearce and the fours silver medal at the 1997 Atlantic Bowls Championships In Llandrindod wells.

She was selected by Wales for the 1998 Commonwealth Games where she competed in the fours event. The team finished in 4th place in section B and therefore missing out on a medal.

References

Living people
Bowls players at the 1998 Commonwealth Games
Welsh female bowls players
Year of birth missing (living people)